Sigurður Hjálmar Jónsson (27 March 1959 – 7 May 1996) was an Icelandic alpine skier. He competed at the 1976 Winter Olympics and the 1980 Winter Olympics. He won the Icelandic championship in slalom in 1980.

References

1959 births
1996 deaths
Sigurdur Jonsson
Sigurdur Jonsson
Alpine skiers at the 1976 Winter Olympics
Alpine skiers at the 1980 Winter Olympics
Sigurdur Jonsson
20th-century Icelandic people